David Wiesner (born February 5, 1956) is an American illustrator and writer of children's books, known best for picture books including some that tell stories without words. As an illustrator he has won three Caldecott Medals recognizing the year's "most distinguished American picture book for children" and he was one of five finalists in 2008 for the biennial, international Hans Christian Andersen Award, the highest recognition available for creators of children's books.

Life

Wiesner was born and raised in Bridgewater Township, New Jersey, and attended Bridgewater-Raritan High School. He graduated from Rhode Island School of Design with a Bachelor of Fine Arts in illustration. Wiesner currently resides outside of Philadelphia with his family.

Career

Wiesner's first book was Honest Andrew, a picture book with text by Gloria Skurzynski, published by Harcourt Brace Jovanovich in 1980. That year he also illustrated a novel by Avi, Man From the Sky (Knopf, 1980). After illustrating a dozen or more books with other writers, he and his wife Kim Kahng co-wrote Loathsome Dragon, a picture book with his illustrations that G.P. Putnam's published in 1987. Since then Wiesner has created many picture books solo—as writer and illustrator, or stories without words. Free Fall (Lothrop, Lee & Shepard, 1988) was a Caldecott Honor Book, a runner-up for the annual Caldecott Medal, conferred by the American Library Association on the illustrator of the year's best-illustrated picture book. 

Free Fall was the first example of the predominant style of his solo books, which tell a fantastical, often dream-like story without words, only illustrations. Subsequently he won three Caldecott Medals for solo picture books—Tuesday (1991), The Three Pigs (2001), and Flotsam (2006)—and he was one of the runners-up for Sector 7 (1999) and Mr. Wuffles! (2013). (Marcia Brown is the only other person to win three Caldecotts, from 1955 to 1983.)

In January 2017, Wiesner had a retrospective art exhibition entitled David Wiesner & the Art of Wordless Storytelling at the Santa Barbara Museum of Art. In the exhibition Wiesner showed his work highlights throughout the years of his career. The exhibition ended May 14, 2017 at SBMA and continued rotating through museums to current day.

Works

As writer and illustrator
1987 Loathsome Dragon, retold by Wiesner and Kim Kahng
1988 Free Fall
1990 Hurricane
1991 Tuesday
1992 June 29, 1999
1999 Sector 7
2001 The Three Pigs
2006 Flotsam
2010 Art & Max
2013 Mr. Wuffles!
2017 Fish Girl
2018 I Got It!
2020 Robobaby

As illustrator
1980 Honest Andrew by Gloria Skurzynski
1980 Man from the Sky by Avi 
1981 Ugly Princess by Nancy Luenn
1981 One Bad Thing about Birthdays by David R. Collins
1981 Boy who Spoke Chimp by Jane Yolen
1982 Owly by Mike Thaler
1982 Neptune Rising: Songs and Tales of the Undersea Folk by Jane Yolen
1983 Miranty and the Alchemist by Vera Chapman
1984 Dark Green Tunnel by Allan W. Eckert
1985 Wand: the Return to Mesmeria by Allan W. Eckert
1985 E.T., the Storybook of the Green Planet by William Kotzwinkle; based on the film story by Steven Spielberg and Melissa Mathison
1986 Kite Flier by Dennis Haseley
1988 Firebrat by Nancy Willard
1989 The Rainbow People by Laurence Yep
1989 The Sorcerer's Apprentice by Marianna Mayer
1991 Tongues of Jade by Laurence Yep
1994 Night of the Gargoyles by Eve Bunting

Other
1989 Cover for The Glass Salamander by Ann Downer
1997 Story and Design for CD-ROM adventure game The Day the World Broke

References

External links

 
 David Wiesner at Library of Congress Authorities —with 30 catalog records

American children's writers
American children's book illustrators
Bridgewater-Raritan High School alumni
Caldecott Medal winners
1956 births
Living people
People from Bridgewater Township, New Jersey